Codringtonia helenae is a species of air-breathing land snail, a terrestrial pulmonate gastropod mollusc in the family Helicidae, the typical snails.

Geographic distribution
C. helenae is endemic to Greece, where it occurs in the central part of Peloponnese.

References

External links

Codringtonia
Endemic fauna of Greece
Molluscs of Europe
Gastropods described in 2005